= Mosor, Travnik =

Mosor
- Village
- Location within Bosnia and Herzegovina
- Coordinates: 44.2336812°N 17.7095084°E
- Country: Bosnia and Herzegovina
- Entity: Federation of Bosnia and Herzegovina
- Canton: Central Bosnia
- Municipality: Travnik

Area
  - Total: 0.73 sq mi (1.90 km^{2})

Population (2013)
  - Total: 265
  - Density: 361/sq mi (139/km^{2})
- Time zone: UTC+1 (CET)
  - Summer (DST): UTC+2 (CEST)

Mosor is a village in the municipality of Travnik, Bosnia and Herzegovina.

== Demographics ==
According to the 2013 census, its population was 265.

Ethnicity in 2013
Ethnicity	Number	Percentage
Bosniaks	259	97.7%
other/undeclared	6	2.3%
Total	265	100%
